Eric Wall is a Swedish researcher also known as "Erica" for founding the Simp DAO. He is a former advisor of the Human Rights Foundation on cryptocurrencies and privacy. Eric Wall is currently Chief Investment Officer at a Scandinavian cryptocurrency hedge fund Arcane Assets

Career 
In 2014, Wall began working at Microsoft as a software engineer. From November 2017, Wall worked as columnist for Bitcoin.com for five months.  From January 2019 to July 2019, he worked as a cryptocurrency and blockchain advisor for Nasdaq, Inc. (After the acquisition of Cinnober by Nasdaq)

In 2019, He joined Arcane Assets(a Scandinavian-based cryptocurrency investment firm) as a chief investment officer.

In January 2022, Wall started Simp DAO as a cisgendered man, photoshopped to look like a woman as a joke. He plans to not make a personal profit from it and instead donate all earning to charitable causes. The concept behind simp DAO is to demonstrate "virtual gender identity" and to find new ways of monetisation in the creator economy.

In February 2022, he announced collaboration with IreneDAO and EuniDAO, calling it "The CreatorDAO Alliance". In April 2022, The CreatorDAO Alliance collapsed.

References 

Living people
Lund University alumni
Microsoft people
People associated with cryptocurrency
21st-century Swedish businesspeople
Year of birth missing (living people)